Overgrown is the second studio album by English electronic musician James Blake. It was released on 5 April 2013 by Blake's Atlas Records, along with A&M Records and Polydor Records. The album features guest appearances from electronic music producer Brian Eno and Wu-Tang Clan member RZA. Overgrown debuted at number eight on the UK Albums Chart and at number one on the US Dance/Electronic chart. It was supported by lead single "Retrograde".

The album was awarded the 2013 Mercury Prize, beating favourites Laura Mvula, Disclosure and David Bowie to win. It also earned Blake a nomination for the Grammy Award for Best New Artist at the 56th Annual Grammy Awards.

Background
Following both the critical and commercial success of Blake's self-titled debut album, Blake released both the Enough Thunder and Love What Happened Here EPs. These EPs, noticeably more structured than his previous releases, featured more R&B tinged work as opposed to the dubstep-influenced electronic sound of CMYK. Many reviewers speculated in the year between releases that Blake was headed in the wrong direction, with Pitchfork's Larry Fitzmaurice saying that "James Blake's reliance on piano-based singer/songwriter electro-soul perhaps played it a bit too safe, prompting comparisons to the once-outré, now-gear spinning career of fellow avant-crooner Jamie Lidell".

Blake admitted to Hot Press in an interview about Overgrown that his relationship affected the album. He said, "I can't deny it. There's no point in trying to come up with some other explanation for what I've been writing about....When it happened, I was really struck. Y'know—suddenly I'm hit!".

Earlier in 2012, Blake spent time with American rapper Kanye West and singer Justin Vernon. In 2012, after months of speculation, Blake announced a new collaborative non-single release under the moniker Harmonimix. This release featured British rapper Trim and the single "Confidence Boost/Saying" was released on 24 September 2012. It was a return to form for Blake and featured the distinct characteristics present in his previous efforts (though "Confidence Boost" had been floating around on the internet for three or four years).

Promotion and release
During the final weeks of 2012, Blake performed three intimate shows where he débuted five of his new songs, the five being "Our Love Comes Back", "Overgrown", "Retrograde", "To the Last" and "Every Day I Ran."

Blake announced via Facebook on 7 February 2013 that his second album, Overgrown, would be released on 8 April. The first single from the album, "Retrograde", was debuted the same day on BBC Radio 1, and was released on 11 February. On 7 March, Blake and his labelmates at 1-800 Dinosaur shared both the dub version of "Voyeur" and the album cut of "Digital Lion" featuring Brian Eno. The title track was released as a single on 10 April alongside a music video directed by Nabil Elderkin. A remix of the track "Life Round Here" featuring Chance the Rapper was released on 11 October alongside a music video directed by Nabil Elderkin.

Critical reception

Overgrown received widespread critical acclaim upon its release. At Metacritic, which assigns a rating out of 100 to reviews from mainstream critics, the album received an average score of 82, based on 40 reviews, which indicates "universal acclaim". Martyn Young of musicOMH stated that "Overgrown is more diverse and dynamic than before. Blake seems to have found an ideal middle ground between restrained and measured balladry and disorientating electronic soul". This sentiment was echoed by The Guardians Paul MacInnes, who wrote that "Blake's palette is unique, his abilities as a composer are great and quite obviously growing." In a review for AllMusic, Fred Thomas described the album as existing "somewhere between the vacant echoes of dub and trip-hop, dubstep's sample-slicing production, and the contained heartbreak of a singer/songwriter playing piano to himself in an empty room," and noted that "while it might take listeners a few spins to find the right head space for the album, once they get there, it's an easy place to get lost in." Clash said the album is "paradoxically less fragmented than its illustrious predecessor, ideas rotating core values guided by an affirmatively unseen hand. Which ultimately makes this an even better record."

On 30 October 2013, the album won the Mercury Music award for album of the year. The lead single, "Retrograde", also won an Ivor Novello Award for Best Contemporary Song.

Overgrown ranked among the top albums for the year, making it on to many end-of-year lists.

Year-end rankings 

"N/A" indicates that the publication did not rank the works included in their year-end list.

"☨" denotes that the Top 10 were unranked and published alphabetically.

Decade-end rankings 

The Decade in Review list incorporates an unranked enumeration of 200 albums spanning the 2010s decade.

Track listing

Personnel
 James Blake – writing, engineering, production, mixing, instrumentation, vocals
 Brian Eno – writing 
 Rob McAndrews – writing, guitar 
 Ben Assiter – additional percussion 
 RZA – vocals 
 Matt Colton – mastering

Charts

Weekly charts

Year-end charts

Certifications and sales

Release history

See also
 List of number-one electronic albums of 2013 (U.S.)

References

2013 albums
A&M Records albums
Albums produced by James Blake (musician)
Albums produced by Brian Eno
James Blake (musician) albums
Mercury Prize-winning albums
Alternative R&B albums
Polydor Records albums
Republic Records albums